Flinders is a seaside town on the Mornington Peninsula in Melbourne, Victoria, Australia,  south of Melbourne's Central Business District, located within the Shire of Mornington Peninsula local government area. Flinders recorded a population of 1,130 at the 2021 census.

Flinders is located at the point where Western Port meets Bass Strait.

History

The town was named by George Bass after his friend, the explorer and British naval officer Matthew Flinders. Settlement commenced in 1854 and many pioneers and settlers are buried at the Flinders cemetery. Flinders Post Office opened on 7 March 1863 as the population grew.

Flinders was once believed to have previously been known as Mendi-Moke, but this has subsequently been denied.

Present day

This area is popular for sailing, fishing, and other watersports.

On the southern side of West Head, the ocean breaks over the basalt rocks of Mushroom Reef Marine Sanctuary at Flinders ocean beach. Mushroom Reef hosts one of Victoria's best intertidal and subtidal rock platform reefs, popular for beachcombing, recreational diving, snorkelling, and surfing. Several accommodation options exist, including B&Bs and hotel-motel style accommodation. Shopping and a mobile library are also available to tourists and residents.

Flinders was the original home of Flinders Bread, available throughout Melbourne and the Mornington Peninsula. The company's operations are now based in Dandenong, but the bread is still available locally.

The Royal Australian Navy operate a weapons training facility and gunnery on West Head, with public access to this area being restricted.

Flinders is served by bus route 782 from Frankston, operated by Ventura Bus Lines.

Flinders Pier is popular for recreational scuba diving activities. It is home to the spectacular weedy sea dragon, as well as many other fish species including cuttlefish, large smooth rays and eagle rays, crabs and plenty of other little fish and critters.

Save Flinders Pier Campaign

On 21 July 2020, The Victorian Government announced the planned "... demolition of the inner section of the old Flinders Pier"  in a media announcement entitled Major Pier Upgrades to Create Jobs and Boost Economy. The media announcement coincided with peak COVID cases and went unreported at the time. The community was alerted on 17 March 2021 in an email from Cr. David Gill, who outlined the threat to the pier; leading to an online search of the Minister's unreported media announcements. On 8 May 2021, a public meeting was organised by the Flinders Community Association and subsequently attended by 300 people. At this meeting, the proposed demolition of the historic pier and its impact on the habitat of the Weedy Sea Dragon at Flinders Pier were discussed, and the Save Flinders Pier campaign was formed. Three critical issues were identified at the meeting which would subsequently inform the Campaign Strategy: (i) the likelihood that removal of the first 180m could lead to the timber pier's full removal given the age of the whole structure; (ii) the possible impact on the habitat of the Weedy Sea Dragon; and (iii) the potential loss of an historic maritime artefact. An online petition quickly built a strong following that eventually reached 42,000 signatories and raised approx. $40,000 in donations; while a petition in village shops recorded a further 2,800 signatories. In July 2021, Sir David Attenborough wrote a letter expressing his concern for the pier habitat of the Weedy Sea Dragon, which was published in The Age newspaper and reported on ABC News and each of Victoria's commercial television news services. On 20 July 2021, the community through the Flinders District Historical Society nominated the pier precinct to the Victorian Heritage Register. This was followed with a letter from the Chairperson of the Save Flinders Pier campaign on 1 August 2021 to all Members of Parliament in the Upper and Lower houses, requesting action to be taken to stop the planned demolition.  On 7 September 2021, the Mornington  Peninsula Shire Council voted unanimously to Save Flinders Pier, observing in Council Meeting Minutes that "the Flinders Pier holds significant historical, social, aesthetic, and environmental values and attracts beneficial tourism to the Western Port region."  Meanwhile, campaign organisers continued to build public awareness by undertaking its own Condition Report of the Flinders Pier. The group established a social media presence featuring its events such as the Flinders Pier beach-clean up supported by Sea Shepherd, Dive for the Pier, Jump for the Pier, School Art Project and towing a 'Weedy Trailer'  up and down the Mornington Peninsula during the summer of 2021/22. 'Save Flinders Pier' signage was displayed on front fences, in shop windows, on the pier itself and along many of the popular walking trails around Red Hill, Merricks and Cape Schanck. Bumper stickers were printed and given out. Merchandise including caps, tee-shirts, hoodies and beanies supporting the group's message were sourced and then sold through the Flinders General Store to help raise funds and increase awareness. The group also used local newspapers and talk-back radio, notably ABC and 3AW, to convey its concern for the pier's future. On 22 February 2022, the Hon. Cathrine Burnett-Wake MP took to the floor of the Parliament of Victoria and requested funding to be directed to the repair and restoration of Flinders Pier. The Hon. Melissa Horne, Minister for Ports, replied at the time that "The intent was never to retain a parallel inner structure (of Flinders Pier) beyond the end of its economic life." In March 2022, Heritage Victoria completed an assessment of the cultural heritage significance of the Flinders Telegraph Cable Complex and Pier, and recommended that Flinders Pier and the nearby cable station precinct be included on the Victorian Heritage Register as a place of State-level cultural significance with objects integral. The recommendation specifically cited the pier's historic connection to (i) the cable station precinct; (ii) scientists and enthusiasts with an interest in the marine life beneath Flinders Pier; and (iii) the "resonance of social value" demonstrated by the public response to the proposed demolition. It further noted that the integrity of the pier remains in its general form, materials and orientation, notwithstanding frequent repairs and replacement of components. The campaign suffered a setback on 9 April 2022 when volunteer and marine biologist, Trent Williams, unexpectedly died during a scuba dive. An Obituary written by the Save Flinders Pier campaign Chairperson and published in The Age and Sydney Morning Herald described Mr Williams as a passionate environmental campaigner known for his voluntary endeavours to protect the marine environment. The Age newspaper later reported a possible link between the death of Mr Williams and a WorkSafe investigation into an air tank re-filling service in East Gippsland.  On 3 May 2022, the Victorian Government released its 2022/23 Budget. On page 116 of Budget Paper 3, a reference was made that "Funding is provided to undertake critical works on.... the Old Flinders Jetty". The following day, Chris Brayne MP said that the Government would commit $1.5m for planning and restoration works. The Age newspaper reported the story with an article entitled "Jubilation from community after plans to restore Flinders Pier".  Following confirmation that Flinders Pier would not be demolished, plans commenced to demobilise the Save Flinders Pier campaign, and move the oversight of the pier's restoration to the Flinders Community Association. On 12 May 2022, Cathrine Burnett-Wake MP addressed the Legislative Council of the Victorian Parliament and said: "I rise to congratulate the Save Flinders Pier committee for their success in saving the pier from demolition..... It was only through their persistence and hard work that this result was achieved" (Hansard, page 1495). On 9 August 2022, the Heritage Council of Victoria considered the Heritage Victoria recommendation for listing the Flinders Pier on its Register. The closed hearing of Heritage Council members followed with a 90 Day Determination Period. On 1 September, The Mornington Peninsula Shire Council published a Community Advocacy Brochure entitled 'Shout Out for the Peninsula''' which described the Save Flinders Pier campaign as a case study in community advocacy. On 7 September, Liberal Party candidate for Nepean, Sam Groth, made an election pledge of $3.5m to the restoration of Flinders Pier. Mr Groth made the commitment to a community gathering at Flinders Pier alongside James Newbury MP Shadow Minister for Ports and Cathrine Burnett-Wake MP, Member for Eastern Victoria. On 14 October 2022, the Save Flinders Campaign suspended further activity when the Heritage Council of Victoria announced its decision that the Flinders Pier and Telegraph Cable Complex "... is of State-level cultural heritage significance and is to be included in the Victorian Heritage Register."'' The Heritage Council decision provided formal protection of the pier, ensuring that demolition was now highly unlikely. The story was reported a few days later in the Mornington Peninsula News where it was described as the first pier on the Mornington Peninsula to be Heritage listed. On 22 December 2022, Parks Victoria issued a Project Status update, informing the community that it has commenced the initial planning, design options and permit stages for repairing Flinders Pier, which will continue through the first half of 2023. Thereafter, construction works will begin in late 2023; with repairs due to be completed in early 2024.

Population

In the 2016 Census, there were 905 people in Flinders.  82.1% of people were born in Australia and 91.4% of people spoke only English at home. The most common responses for religion were No Religion 41.0%, Anglican 23.5% and Catholic 12.6%.

See also
 Shire of Flinders – Flinders was previously within this former local government area.

References

External links
Mornington Peninsula National Park
Visit Flinders – a visitors guide to Flinders Village on the Mornington Peninsula

Towns in Victoria (Australia)
Coastal towns in Victoria (Australia)
Mornington Peninsula
Western Port